Laura-Leigh Moser (born January 9, 1991) known professionally as simply Laura-Leigh, is an American actress. She is best known for her roles in the films The Ward and We're the Millers and as a series regular on the TV series The Client List and season 1 of Vanderpump Rules.

Life and career
She grew up in Maumelle, Arkansas.

She graduated from the Juilliard School and upon graduation had a role in the Second Stage Theatre production of Boy's Life, directed by Michael Greif.

After guest starring in several TV series', she co-starred as Zoey in John Carpenter's film The Ward opposite Amber Heard and Mamie Gummer. 

Laura-Leigh appeared as herself on the Bravo reality TV series Vanderpump Rules. She was working as a server at SUR, the West Hollywood, California, restaurant owned by former The Real Housewives of Beverly Hills cast member Lisa Vanderpump. She quit her job at SUR and the series for the role of "Kymberly" in the Warner Bros. Pictures comedy film We're the Millers opposite Jennifer Aniston. The film grossed over $270 million worldwide.

Laura-Leigh played the series regular character of "Nikki Shannon" in Jennifer Love Hewitt's TV series The Client List. She co-starred in the comedy motion picture Tooken, a parody of the Taken film series. 

Laura-Leigh appeared in David Robert Mitchell's neo-noir crime thriller Under the Silver Lake opposite Andrew Garfield, Zosia Mamet, and Riley Keough in 2019.

Filmography

Film

Television

References

External links

Rumorfix

American film actresses
American television actresses
Living people
21st-century American actresses
Juilliard School alumni
People from Maumelle, Arkansas
1991 births
Place of birth missing (living people)
Actresses from Arkansas